is a Japanese footballer currently playing as a left back for Shimizu S-Pulse.

Career statistics

Club
.

Notes

References

External links

1999 births
Living people
Sportspeople from Kyoto
Association football people from Kyoto Prefecture
University of Tsukuba alumni
Japanese footballers
Japan youth international footballers
Association football defenders
J1 League players
Shimizu S-Pulse players